Celta Vigo contested La Liga and the Copa del Rey in the 1994–95 season. They placed 13th in La Liga, an improvement of two places on the previous season. They couldn't match their runner-up performance from the previous year's Copa del Rey, as they were eliminated in the fourth round by Real Mallorca.

Squad

Left club during season

Squad stats 
Last updated on 27 February 2021.

|-
|colspan="14"|Players who have left the club after the start of the season:

|}

Results

La Liga

League table

Matches

Copa del Rey

Third round 

Celta Vigo won 6–2 on aggregate

Fourth round 

Real Mallorca won 2–1 on aggregate

References

External links 
Spain 1994/95 at RSSSF

RC Celta de Vigo seasons
Celta